Merlyn Vivienne Lowther (born March 1954) was Chief Cashier of the Bank of England from 1999 to 2003. She was the first woman to hold the post. The signature of the Chief Cashier appears on Bank of England banknotes. Lowther was succeeded by Andrew Bailey.

Since February 2013, Lowther has been a deputy chairman of Co-Operative Banking Group Limited and the Co-operative Bank plc.

Biography 
Merlyn Vivienne Lowther was educated at Manchester High School for Girls and went onto graduate with first class honours in Mathematics in 1975 at University of Manchester. Merlyn Lowther went on to gain her MSc (Economics) from the London Business School in 1981. Merlyn Lowther joined the bank direct from university as analyst in the Economics Division.  Over fifteen years Merlyn Lowther worked within Money Market Operations, Foreign Exchange and the Gilt Edged Division. Merlyn Lowther was the first woman in the Bank's 300 year history to hold the position of Chief Cashier and a Deputy Director. Merlyn Lowther retired on 31 December 2003.

References

External links
Merlyn Lowther (1999-2003)

1954 births
Living people
Chief Cashiers of the Bank of England
People educated at Manchester High School for Girls